Dangermuffin is an American band from Folly Beach, South Carolina. Their musical styles include Americana, folk, and jam music that's organic and cool. The band is a trio whose instrumentation includes acoustic guitar, electric guitar, and drums. The group was founded in 2007 and has been touring throughout the United States since. Dangermuffin released their sixth album, Heritage, in May 2017.

Style
Dangermuffin's music is known for the songwriting and vocals of Dan Lotti, winner of the Songwriters Hall of Fame's 2005 "New Writers Showcase." Their music receives heavy airplay on Sirius XM Radio and was featured in the June 2011 issue of Relix Magazine. Dangermuffin was voted the Best Jam/Groove/Reggae Band of the Year in the 2011 Charleston City Paper Music Awards.

Philanthropy
Dangermuffin gave back to the community after donating a percentage of merchandise sales to the Ronald McDonald House Charity of Charleston, SC. They also hosted the Turkey Jam, a benefit for the Low country Food Bank that raised over $3,000.

Discography
Heritage (2017)
Songs for the Universe (2014)
Olly Oxen Free (2012)
Moonscapes (2010)
Emancee (2008, EP)
Beermuda (2007)

Live Performances

Dangermuffin has performed at some of the largest attended music festivals in the United States, including Wanee Music Festival in Florida, moe.down in New York, Bristol Rhythm & Roots Reunion in Tennessee, Taos Mountain Music Festival in New Mexico, Summer Camp Music Festival in Illinois, FloydFest  and Rooster Walk in Virginia, Jazz Aspen in Colorado, and All Good Music Festival in Masontown, West Virginia. Dangermuffin has also opened for bands like Hot Tuna with Jorma Kaukonen and O.A.R.

Members
Dan Lotti - lyrics and acoustic guitar 
Mike Sivilli - lyrics and electric guitar 
Steven Sandifer - lyrics, upright bass guitar and drum set (2008–2019) 

Johnny Calamari - bass (2018–Present) 
Jim Donnelly - drum set (2007–2008)

References

External links

Live Music Recordings

American folk musical groups